The 2009 ATP Salzburg Indoors was a professional tennis tournament played on indoor hard courts. It was the first edition of the tournament and was part of the 2009 ATP Challenger Tour. It took place in Salzburg, Austria between 30 November and 6 December 2009.

Singles main-draw entrants

Seeds

 Rankings are as of November 23, 2009.

Other entrants
The following players received a Special Exempt into the singles main draw:
  Marco Mirnegg
  Max Raditschnigg
  Nicolas Reissig
  Dudi Sela

The following players received wildcards into the singles main draw:
  Martin Fischer
  Uladzimir Ignatik

The following players received entry from the qualifying draw:
  Rameez Junaid
  Franko Škugor
  Roman Valent
  Antal van der Duim

Champions

Singles

 Michael Berrer def.  Jarkko Nieminen, 6–7(4), 6–4, 6–4

Doubles

 Philipp Marx /  Igor Zelenay def.  Sanchai Ratiwatana /  Sonchat Ratiwatana, 6–4, 7–5

External links
ITF search 
2009 Draws

ATP Salzburg Indoors
ATP Salzburg Indoors
ATP Salzburg